Cactus is the eponymous debut studio album by American hard rock band Cactus. Released in 1970 through Atco Records. It includes original songs from the band as well as two covers of Mose Allison's version of a blues standard, "Parchman Farm" and Willie Dixon's "You Can't Judge a Book by the Cover". The album is also notable for the track "Let Me Swim" which later loosely inspired the 1978 guitar solo "Eruption" composed by Eddie Van Halen.

Track listing 
All titles written and arranged by Appice, Bogert, Day and McCarty, except where noted.
 "Parchman Farm" (Mose Allison) – 3:06
 "My Lady from South of Detroit" – 4:26
 "Bro. Bill" – 5:10
 "You Can't Judge a Book by the Cover" (Willie Dixon) – 6:30
 "Let Me Swim" – 3:50
 "No Need to Worry" – 6:14
 "Oleo" – 4:51
 "Feel So Good" – 6:03

Personnel 

Cactus
 Rusty Day – lead vocals, harmonica
 Jim McCarty – guitar
 Carmine Appice – drums
 Tim Bogert – bass

Production
 Bill Stahl – recording engineer
 Gene Paul – remix engineer
 Mark L. Rollins, Jr. – art direction, photography

Charts

Notes 

1970 debut albums
Cactus (American band) albums
Atco Records albums
Albums produced by Tim Bogert
Albums produced by Carmine Appice
Albums produced by Jim McCarty
Albums produced by Rusty Day